The discography of Maino, an American hip hop recording artist, consists of two studio albums, one compilation album, one extended play (EP), thirteen mixtapes, nine singles (including three as a featured artist), four promotional singles and nine music videos.

Studio albums

Collaborative albums

Compilation albums

EPs

Mixtapes

Singles

As lead artist

As featured artist

Promotional singles

Guest appearances

Music videos

As lead artist

As featured artist

References

 
 
Hip hop discographies
Discographies of American artists